John "James" Alcorn Rector (June 22, 1884 – March 10, 1949) was an American athlete. He was the first Arkansas-born athlete to compete in the Olympic Games. While competing he was a University of Virginia student and went there to train with Pop Lannigan.

James Rector was born in Hot Springs, Arkansas. He was the grandson of Arkansas Civil War governor Henry Massey Rector and Mississippi Reconstruction governor James Alcorn.

He won the silver medal in the 100 metres at the 1908 Summer Olympics, tying the Olympic record for the race (10.8 seconds at the time) during both the qualifying heats and the semifinals. He lost to Reggie Walker in the final, running the race in 10.9 seconds as Walker hit the 10.8 mark for his second time.

Rector was not only a track star at Virginia, but was a star of the Virginia baseball and football teams. Rector was a prominent St. Louis, Missouri lawyer for more than thirty years before retiring in Hot Springs.

References

Sources
 
 
 

1884 births
1949 deaths
American male sprinters
Athletes (track and field) at the 1908 Summer Olympics
Olympic silver medalists for the United States in track and field
Track and field athletes from Arkansas
Sportspeople from Hot Springs, Arkansas
Medalists at the 1908 Summer Olympics
American people of English descent
American people of Scotch-Irish descent